The Consensus 1999 College Basketball All-American team, as determined by aggregating the results of four major All-American teams.  To earn "consensus" status, a player must win honors from a majority of the following teams: the Associated Press, the USBWA, The Sporting News and the National Association of Basketball Coaches.

1999 Consensus All-America team

Individual All-America teams

AP Honorable Mention:

 William Avery, Duke
 Pat Bradley, Arkansas
 Rodney Buford, Creighton
 Keith Carter, Mississippi
 Eric Chenowith, Kansas
 Ed Cota, North Carolina
 Khalid El-Amin, Connecticut
 Chico Fletcher, Arkansas State
 A. J. Guyton, Indiana
 Venson Hamilton, Nebraska
 Jumaine Jones, Georgia
 Arthur Lee, Stanford
 Melvin Levett, Cincinnati
 Todd MacCulloch, Washington
 Mark Madsen, Stanford
 Kenyon Martin, Cincinnati
 Sean Mason, Wisconsin
 BJ McKie, South Carolina
 Chris Mihm, Texas
 Terence Morris, Maryland
 Lee Nailon, TCU
 Lamar Odom, Rhode Island
 Ademola Okulaja, North Carolina
 Scott Padgett, Kentucky
 Morris Peterson, Michigan State
 James Posey, Xavier
 Laron Profit, Maryland
 Quentin Richardson, DePaul
 Doc Robinson, Auburn
 Shawnta Rogers, George Washington
 Matt Santangelo, Gonzaga
 Kenny Thomas, New Mexico
 Wayne Turner, Kentucky

References

NCAA Men's Basketball All-Americans
All-Americans